New Democratic Party leadership elections, more commonly known as leadership conventions, are the process by which the Canadian New Democratic Party elects its leader.

Before 2003, when a modified one member, one vote (OMOV) system was adopted, every biennial New Democratic Party convention, since 1961, was a leadership convention. However, in practice, contested elections were held only when there was a declared leadership race. The earliest example of an incumbent leader being challenged from the convention floor happened in 1973 when Douglas Campbell unsuccessfully opposed David Lewis' leadership. In 2001, Socialist Caucus member Marcel Hatch challenged Alexa McDonough from the floor of the convention; however, McDonough easily retained the leadership in the resulting vote.

When the NDP was created by the merger of the Co-operative Commonwealth Federation (CCF) and the Canadian Labour Congress (CLC), trade unions were allowed to directly affiliate to the party, and a system was unofficially arranged so that up to one-third of all delegates to NDP conventions were selected by labour and the other two-thirds by NDP riding associations. This was also the case at leadership conventions, giving the labour movement a significant say in determining the party's leadership. Under the current system, each biennial federal convention includes a vote at which the delegates decide whether a leadership convention should be held. Then-leader Thomas Mulcair lost such a vote at the 2016 convention, resulting in the 2017 leadership election being called.

In practice, all three CCF leaders had been chosen by their parliamentary caucus and then elected unanimously at a subsequent national convention.

1961 leadership convention results

Held in Ottawa, Ontario on August 3, 1961.

1971 leadership convention results

Held in Ottawa, Ontario on April 24, 1971.

1973 leadership challenge results
Held in Vancouver, British Columbia on Friday, July 20, 1973.

1975 leadership convention results

Held in Winnipeg, Manitoba on July 7, 1975.

1989 leadership convention results

Held in Winnipeg, Manitoba on December 2, 1989.

1995 leadership convention results

Held in Ottawa, Ontario on October 14, 1995.

The NDP held a series of regional and labour "caucus votes" prior to the national convention.  A fourth candidate, Herschel Hardin, participated in the regional caucuses but did not win sufficient delegate support to qualify for the convention. These "primaries" were OMOV.

As the last place finisher on the first ballot, Nystrom was dropped. However, Robinson determined that he could not win on the second ballot if Nystrom's supporters moved to McDonough, as they were expected to, thus he withdrew and McDonough was declared the winner.

2001 leadership challenge results
Held in Winnipeg, Manitoba on Sunday, November 25, 2001.

Marcel Hatch, a leader of the NDP's Socialist Caucus, stood for leader as a challenge to Alexa McDonough's leadership.

There were 42 spoiled ballots. If these are factored in McDonough's level of support was 78% overall.

2003 leadership election results

Held in Toronto, Ontario on January 25, 2003.

For this election, the NDP instituted a modified one member one vote system. Votes by labour delegates accounted for 25% of the total result, while votes cast by party members accounted for 75%. The carve out for labour was eliminated prior to the 2012 election.

2012 leadership election

The leadership convention was held at the Metro Toronto Convention Centre on March 24, 2012. There were 128,351 eligible voters, most voting from home and not delegates at the convention.

The party chose Thomas Mulcair as their new leader following the death of Jack Layton on August 22, 2011. A One member, one vote process was used.

 = Eliminated from next round
 = Withdrew nomination
 = Winner

2017 leadership election

Voting was held between September 18 to October 1, 2017. The results were announced on October 1 in Toronto, Ontario at the Westin Harbour Castle.

Spoiled ballots: 101
Abstentions: 172
Turnout: 52.8% (1.9pp)

References and notes